Psenes pellucidus, the bluefin driftfish, is a species of driftfish native to the Atlantic, Indian and Pacific oceans where it is found in deep waters to a depth of 1000 m. ). It is also present in low abundance since the mid-20th century in the western Mediterranean Sea which it most likely entered via the Strait of Gibraltar.  It can reach a length of 80 cm TL.

References

Nomeidae
Fish described in 1880